Otter Falls may refer to:

 Otter Falls (Yukon)
 Otter Falls (Washington)